Suspensura is the architectural term given by Vitruvius  to piers of square bricks (about 20 cm × 20 cm) that supported a suspended floor of a Roman bath covering a hypocaust cavity through which the hot air would flow.

Notes 

Ancient Roman architectural elements
Ancient Roman baths
Bricks